The Offaly Way is a long-distance trail in County Offaly, Ireland. It is typically completed in two days. It is designated as a National Waymarked Trail by the National Trails Office of the Irish Sports Council and is managed by Offaly County Council, Bord na Mona and the Offaly Integrated Development Company. The trail provides a link between the Slieve Bloom Way and the Grand Canal Way. 

Starting at Cadamstown, the trail follows an old mass path along the banks of the Silver River to reach Kilcormac. It then crosses Boora bog, an area noted for its Mesolithic archaeology. It then passes through the Turraun Nature Reserve before crossing the Grand Canal and following the River Brosna to Lemanaghan. 

A review of the National Waymarked Ways found low usage of the Offaly Way and recommended a reduction in the amount of walking on tarred roads, better interpretation of the historic sites along the route, consideration to extending the route to Clonmacnoise, Pollagh or Clara and consideration to promoting the trail as a dual walking and cycling route.

References

Notes

Bibliography

External links
 Offaly Way at IrishTrails.ie
 Offaly Way at Shannon Region Trails

Geography of County Offaly
Tourist attractions in County Offaly
Long-distance trails in the Republic of Ireland